Mount Seymour Provincial Park is a park in Vancouver, British Columbia's North Shore Mountains. With an area of 35 square kilometres, it is located approximately 15 kilometres north of Downtown Vancouver. The park, named after Frederick Seymour, was established in 1936. Mount Seymour Provincial Park provides visitors with a variety of recreational activities and animals with natural habitat.

Geography
Mount Seymour Provincial Park is in a mountain wilderness setting and several mountain peaks lie within its boundaries, including Mount Bishop, Mount Elsay, Runner Peak, and Mount Seymour. This park and its several mountain peaks are provincially run and operated. The highest elevation in the park is the summit of Mount Bishop at 1509 metres followed by Mount Seymour, for which the park is named, at 1449 metres.
The park contains several lakes, including Elsay Lake (the largest), Pencier Lake, Gopher Lake, and Goldie Lake. Many lakes within the park drain into the Seymour River, which is west of the park.

Climate
Mount Seymour Provincial Park features an oceanic climate (Köppen climate type Cfb).

Animals and wildlife

Mount Seymour Provincial Park is a habitat for a variety of wildlife animal and plant species. Among the bigger animals, deer and coyotes are most frequently observed near the access road, while in the backcountry, black bears, bobcats or cougars can be seen. To preserve the wildlife and to prevent attacks, the park has laws against hikers and tourists from feeding or tormenting wildlife animals. Groups like the Society For The Prevention Of Cruelty To Animals (BC SPCA) and the Animal Advocates Society look to preserve and protect animals.

The park is home to much smaller animals and creatures as well. Species of birds such as the chickadee, sapsucker, grouse and siskin are commonly seen. Mount Seymour park provides an opportunity to see other birds like the Canada jay, raven, and the Steller's jay, which happens to be the official bird of British Columbia. This bird was chosen as British Columbia's Ministry of Environment and Parks launched a three-month campaign to select a provincial bird in 1987. The campaign was tied in with the province’s celebration of Wildlife ‘87, the centennial of wildlife conservation in Canada.

These wild animals are found in Mount Seymour Provincial Park.

Vegetation

The Mount Seymour Provincial Park is 3,508 hectares with a variety of natural foliage and forest. The park contains old-growth Douglas fir trees and western red cedar that cover the landscape. As well, second-growth coniferous and deciduous trees populate the park. At higher elevations of the park, we see a transition from forest to open meadows. In certain areas, it is common to see sub-alpine flowers like the blu clematis, ballhead waterleaf and the Cusick's speedwell flower.

The Provincial Park on Mount Seymour has a history of infestations of various invasive plants. Invasive plants (also called "non-indigenous" or "non-native") outcompete native species for basic necessities, such as nutrients and space, affecting many habitats and bioregions. Mount Seymour Provincial Park is no stranger to its own share of invasive plants. There are often clumps of Japanese knotweed seen around the park. It is common to see  bull thistles growing on a mound of old road and clay pushed up around a pullout. St John’s wort, Lamium and Himalayan blackberry grow among the thicket of native flora that provide a view for occasional mountain bikers that pass by. Some of the other invasive plants inventoried by the park include:
Lamium (yellow archangel)
Periwinkle
Yellow hawkweed
Sow thistle
Oxeye daisy

Japanese knotweed is harmful to the ecosystem because it takes up available habitat for the native species thereby decreasing the biodiversity and disrupting the food chain. Also, knotweed roots are known to break off and float downstream, forming new infestation and threatening the stream banks. Yellow hawkweed tends to invade open and undisturbed natural areas. It establishes and spreads along roads or areas that are yet to reforest, affecting the forest industry.

Invasive plants are often handled and dealt with by the Invasive Species Council of Metro Vancouver (ISCMV).  The ISCMV conduct inventory and both mechanical and chemical invasive species control work. Their projects and work extend across the Metro Vancouver Area. They deal with invasive species like knotweed, giant hogweed and selective herbicide control methods. Invasive Species Council (ISC) of British Columbia deals with the invasive plants as well. It has Invasive Plant Training Program that teaches invasive plant identification, inventory skill, s monitoring techniques and tools of integrated pest management to the participants. Also, ISC organizes Community Weed Pulls to gather volunteer groups to get rid of the invasive plants.

Recreational activities
There is an extensive network of mountain biking, hiking, and equestrian trails on the lower mountain, while the upper mountain offers picknicking, skiing, snowboarding, snowshoeing, snowtubing, tobogganing, and backcountry camping. Different parts of mountain trails have different uses throughout the year. While both mountain bikers and hikers can use lower mountain trails, upper mountain trails are restricted to hikers.

Summer season
Mount Seymour Provincial Park provides 14 different hiking trails varying with elevation levels and difficulties.

*Unclear information is marked with -

Mountain biking is permitted only on designated trails within the park boundary. The mountain bike restricted trails include Upper Old Buck Access Trail, Mount Seymour Main Trail, Perimeter Trail, Goldie Lake Trail, Flower Lake Trail, Mystery Lake Trail, Old Cabin Trail and Dinky Peak Trail.

Old Buck Trail is the only trail throughout the park that allows horseback riding.

There are several lakes in Mount Seymour Provincial Park such as Goldie Lake, Flower Lake, and Mystery Lake. There is no regulation for swimming but there are no lifeguards at duty.

With a valid fishing licence, visitors of the park can fish in the Elsay Lake; it can be accessed only through Elsay Lake trail.

Winter season
The provincial park provides winter trails for activities like snowshoeing and backcountry skiing. These trails are open from mid-December to March 31 each year. Snowshoers, backcountry skiers, snowboarders and hikers are also allowed use of these the backcountry trails. Passes or permits are not required to use the BC Parks Backcountry.

Mount Seymour Ski Resort

Mount Seymour is one mountain located within the Mount Seymour Provincial Park. Originally, Mount Seymour was operated by the provincial government and was deemed a "recreation area" by the provincial government, which is defined as land set aside for public recreational use. In 1984, the government gave control of Mount Seymour to the commercial entity and private operator, Mount Seymour Resorts Ltd. Through this transfer of ownership, the mountain changed from being a recreational area, to requiring a "park use permit". With a park use permit, this allows Mount Seymour Resorts to provide commercial recreation services, which may include summer or winter activities.

The ski area of Mount Seymour Resorts has 4 ski lifts:
the Mystery Peak Express quad chairlift,
Brockton,
Lodge double chairlifts,
Goldie Lake covered magic carpet

The company offers activities such as skiing and snowboarding are available on 39 marked trails and many unmarked routes. The privately owned area has   vertical drop as well as 18 trails open for night skiing. Five additional terrain parks, Seymour Park, The Pit Terrain Park, Young Gun Terrain Park, Northlands Park and Mushroom Park, belonging to Mount Seymour, exist for freestyle activities.

Mount Seymour Resorts offers snow tubing and tobogganing, by offering the Enquist Tube Park. The Tube Park offers four tubing lanes with a vertical drop of 100 meters and eight toboggan lanes.

Accidents and rescues

Due to its proximity to a large metropolitan area, Mount Seymour Provincial Park attracts larger numbers of visitors and recreational users than many other rugged, mountainous areas. This in part, has led to hundreds of lost, stranded, and injured hikers, as well as many skiers and snowshoers that have required rescue, and even suffered death. Visitors should be aware there are incidents such as in July 2010, a longboarder was killed from an accident outside Mount Seymour Provincial Park.

The North Shore Rescue is a mountain search and rescue team. The team consists of approximately 40 volunteers skilled in search and rescue operations in mountain, canyon and urban settings. They are often called when an individual is trapped or in danger in the park.

Broadcasting and media
Mount Seymour is home to many Vancouver-area broadcasters. They have their transmitters set up on the slopes of Mount Seymour, allowing it to face over the entire Greater Vancouver area.
Some broadcasters include FM radio station, CKKS-FM-2 107.5 (Kiss) and CJAX-FM 96.9 (Jack FM). As well, many TV stations such as   CBUT-DT (CBC): UHF 43 (digital) and CHAN-DT (Global): UHF 22 (digital) have their transmitters located on the mountain.

See also
List of ski areas and resorts in Canada
Grouse Mountain
Cypress Mountain
Mount Seymour
Whistler, British Columbia

References

External links

Mount Seymour Ski Resort Official Site
Mount Seymour Ski Club Mount Seymour Ski Club Official Site

Maps and resources
Map of Mt Seymour Provincial Park
Mountain Trails
Parking Lot Map
Brochure by Mt.Seymour Provincial Park

Seymour
Ski areas and resorts in British Columbia
North Vancouver (district municipality)
Seymour
Parks in Greater Vancouver
Provincial parks of British Columbia
1936 establishments in British Columbia
Protected areas established in 1936